Live Across America is The Rippingtons' second live album (preceded by 1992's Live in L.A.) which was released in 2002.

Track listing
"Road Warriors" - 4:15
"Summer Lovers" - 6:35
"Welcome to the St. James' Club" - 5:15
"Hideaway" - 3:57
"Black Diamond" - 5:00
"South Beach Mambo" - 4:39
"She Likes to Watch" - 5:38
"Jewel Thieves" - 8:34
"Rain" - 7:07
"Avenida del Mar" - 3:59
"Purple Haze / Fire Medley" - 1:42
"Fire" - 1:42
"The Star-Spangled Banner" - 2:46
"Are We There Yet?" - 4:29

Personnel 

 Russ Freeman – guitars
 Bill Heller – keyboards 
 Rico Belled – bass
 Kim Stone – bass
 Dave Hooper – drums
 Dave Karasony – drums
 Scott Breadman – percussion
 Ray Yslas – percussion 
 Eric Marienthal – saxophones
 Paul Taylor – saxophones

Production
 Russ Freeman – producer, executive producer, arrangements, mixing 
 Nick Sodano – producer (1-5, 7, 8, 9), recording, mixing, tour manager 
 Andi Howard – executive producer, management 
 Robert Hadley – mastering 
 Doug Sax – mastering 
 Valerie Ince – A&R assistance
 Leilani Shelby – production coordinator

Smooth jazz albums
Live jazz fusion albums
2002 live albums
The Rippingtons albums